Sobolev (masculine) and Soboleva (feminine) is a popular Russian surname, derived from the word "соболь" (sable). Notable people with the surname include:
Arkady Sobolev, Russian diplomat
Aleksandr Sobolev (born 1997), Russian footballer
Aleksandr Sobolev (footballer, born 1995), Russian footballer
Aleksei Sobolev (footballer) (1968–2001), Russian footballer
Boris Sobolev, Canadian health services researcher
Denis Sobolev (born 1993), Russian footballer
Felix Sobolev (1931–1984), Ukrainian filmmaker
Leonid Sobolev (1844–1913), Russian general
Sergei Sobolev (politician) (b. 1961), Ukrainian politician
Sergei Sobolev (1908–1989), Russian mathematician
Viktor Sobolev — several people
Vitaliy Sobolev (1930–1995), Soviet footballer
Vladimir Sobolev (disambiguation), several people
Vyacheslav Sobolev (born 1984),  Kazakhstan footballer
Yelena Soboleva (born 1982), Russian runner

See also
Soboleff

Russian-language surnames